Colobodactylus dalcyanus, also known commonly as Vanzolini's teiid, is a species of lizard in the family Gymnophthalmidae. The species is endemic to Brazil.

Etymology
The specific name, dalcyanus, is in honor of Brazilian entomologist Dalcy de Oliveira Albuquerque (1902–1982).

Geographic range
C. dalcyanus is found in the Brazilian state of São Paulo.

Habitat
The preferred natural habitats of C. dalcyanus are forest and rocky areas.

Reproduction
C. dalcyanus is oviparous.

References

Further reading
Bernardo PH, Guerra-Fuentes RA, Zaher H (2011). "Colobodactylus dalcyanus (NCN): Reproduction". Herpetological Bulletin (118): 36–38.
Bernardo PH, Junqueira AFB, Martins IA (2011). "A new geographic distribution record of the rare lizard Colobodactylus dalcyanus Vanzolini and Ramos, 1977 (Squamata, Gymnophthalmidae, Heterodactylini)". Herpetology Notes 4: 327–329.
Vanzolini P, Ramos AMM (1977). "A new species of Colobodactylus, with notes on the distribution of a group of stranded microteiid lizards (Sauria, Teiidae)". Papéis Avulsos de Zoologia, Museu de Zoologia da Universidade de São Paulo 31 (3): 19–47. (Colobodactylus darcyanus, new species).

Colobodactylus
Reptiles of Brazil
Endemic fauna of Brazil
Reptiles described in 1977
Taxa named by Paulo Vanzolini
Taxa named by Ana Maria Malva Ramos Costa